Horațiu Eugen Pungea (born 18 February 1986) is a Romanian rugby union footballer. He plays as a prop for Lyon.

He started his career at CS Universitatea Cluj-Napoca before moving to play for RC Timișoara in the Romanian Rugby Championship. In October 2013 he signed a short-term deal with the Scarlets

He has 30 caps for Romania, having to score yet his first points. He made his international debut on 10 November 2012, in a 23-34 loss to Japan, in Bucharest. He was selected in the Romania squad for their autumn internationals in November 2013. He was called for the 2015 Rugby World Cup. He played in two games as a substitute.

External links

Horațiu Pungea at Timișoara Saracens website

1986 births
Living people
People from Luduș
Romanian rugby union players
Romania international rugby union players
SCM Rugby Timișoara players
Scarlets players
Lyon OU players
Oyonnax Rugby players
Llanelli RFC players
București Wolves players
Rugby union props